What on Earth may refer to:

 What on Earth! (film), a 1966 National Film Board of Canada animated short co-directed by Les Drew and Kaj Pindal
 What on Earth (Canadian game show),  a Canadian quiz and talk show series which aired on CBC Television from 1971 to 1975
 What on Earth? (U.S. TV program), an American television program which debuted on Science Channel in 2015
 What on Earth Publishing, a British publisher founded by Christopher Lloyd